Tom Chapin (born March 13, 1945) is an American musician, entertainer, singer-songwriter, and storyteller.

Chapin is known for the song "Happy Birthday", released in 1989 in his Moonboat album. It takes its melody from "Love Unspoken", a song featured in the opera The Merry Widow by Franz Lehar.

Biography
Chapin is the son of Jim Chapin and the brother of Harry Chapin. He graduated from Brooklyn Technical High School. He attended State University of New York at Plattsburgh where he played basketball and baseball. Chapin is a member of the school's 1000 Point Club  in basketball and is a 1986 inductee of the Plattsburgh State Athletic Hall of Fame. He graduated in 1966.

From 1971 to 1976, Chapin hosted Make a Wish, an Emmy and Peabody Award-winning Sunday-morning children's TV series broadcast on ABC. He occasionally appears in Harry Chapin tribute concerts (often with brother Steve Chapin). He has appeared in the Broadway production Pump Boys and Dinettes, among others. Chapin has branched in to the storytelling festival circuit and in 2007 was a Featured New Voices Teller at the National Storytelling Festival in Jonesborough, Tennessee.

He is married to Bonnie Chapin (née Broecker), former wife of film director Wes Craven and sister of Wallace Smith Broecker. His daughters and stepdaughter are musicians as well; they perform as the Chapin Sisters.

Activism
In April 2008, Chapin appeared at the New York State United Teachers' Convention, where he sang his song "Not on the Test" for delegates in support of the importance of arts and music education in the age of No Child Left Behind. This song debuted on NPR's Morning Edition in January 2007. His album with John Forster titled Broadsides: A Miscellany of Musical Opinion is a collection of socially conscious songs written for Morning Edition; Forster was nominated for a Grammy for his work producing Chapin's 1998 album In My Hometown.

Chapin continues support of WhyHunger (formerly World Hunger Year), a nonprofit organization cofounded by his brother Harry Chapin. He sits on their board of directors.

Awards
 1990 NACA Campus Entertainment Award (NACA)
 1991 Best Children's Album Mother Earth (New York Music Awards)
 1992 Best Children's Album Billy The Squid (New York Music Awards)
 1992 Omicron Delta Kappa (initiated at SUNY Plattsburgh)
1997 Kate Wolf Memorial Award (World Folk Music Association)
 2001 Grammy Award: Best Spoken Word Album For Children, Mama Don't Allow
 2002 Grammy Award: Best Spoken Word Album For Children, There Was an Old Lady Who Swallowed a Fly
 2004 Grammy Award: Best Spoken Word Album For Children, The Train They Call the City of New Orleans
 2008 American Eagle Award (National Music Council of the United States)
 Magic Penny Award (The Children's Music Network)
 MENC Fame Award (The National Association for Music Education)
 2020 Spirit of The Hudson Award (Hudson River Sloop Clearwater Org.)

Discography

Albums
Life Is Like That (1976, Sundance Music)
In The City of Mercy (1982, Sundance Music)
Let Me Back into Your Life (1986, Flying Fish Records)
Family Tree (1988, A&M)
Moonboat (1989, Sony)
Mother Earth  (1990, A&M)
Billy the Squid (1992, Sony)
Zag Zig (1994, Sony)
Around the World and Back Again (1996, Sony Wonder)
This Pretty Planet (1996, Sony)
Join The Jubilee (1996, Gadfly)
Doing Our Job with John McCutcheon (1997, Rounder Select)
In My Hometown (1998, Sony)
Common Ground (2001, Gadfly)
Great Big Fun for the Very Little One (2001, Music Little People)
Making Good Noise (2003, Gadfly)
 Bring Back the Joy!, compilation (2004, Organic Arts Ltd)
Some Assembly Required  (2005, Razor & Tie)
The Turning Of The Tide (2006, CDBY)
So Nice To Come Home (2008, Sundance Music)
Let The Bad Times Roll (2009, CDBY)
Broadsides with John Forster (2010, CDBY)
Give Peas a Chance (2011, Sundance Music)
The Incredible Flexible You (2013, Sundance Music)
70 (2015, Sundance Music)
Threads (2017, Sundance Music)
At the Turning Point (2019, Sundance Music)

Singles

Family Tree (1988)
"The Nick of Time"
"Shovelling"
"The Big Rock Candy Mountain"
"Someone's Gonna Use It"
"Family Tree"
"This Pretty Planet"
"Uh-Oh, Accident"
"Together Tomorrow"

Moonboat (1989)
"Library Song"
"Sing a Whale Song"
"State Laughs"
"Happy Birthday"
"Don't Play With Bruno"
"Alphabet Soup"

Mother Earth (1990)
"A Song of One"
"Two Kinds of Seagulls"
"The Wheel of the Water"
"Good Garbage"
"Mother Earth's Routine"
"Cousins"

Billy the Squid (1992)
"Great Big Words"
"All of My Friends"
"You'll Be Sorry"
"Camelling"
"Happy Earth Day"
"Billy the Squid"

Zag Zig (1994)
"The Backwards Birthday Party"
"Mikey Won't"
"R-E-C-Y-C-L-E"
"Hi, Hi, I Love Ya"
"Loose Tooth"
"Clean Machine"
"Johnny Glockenspiel"

Around the World and Back Again (1996)
"What Is a Didgeridoo?"
"Song of the Earth"

Filmography

Film

Television

References

External links

Tom Chapin's Official Website
Not On The Test Website

Tom Chapin's recording of 'Left My Gal in the Mountains' for Pioneers for a Cure

1945 births
Living people
American children's musicians
American storytellers
Grammy Award winners
State University of New York at Plattsburgh alumni
Brooklyn Technical High School alumni